The Bull of the Woods Wilderness is a wilderness area located in the Mount Hood National Forest in the northwestern Cascades of Oregon, United States. It was created in 1984 and consists of  including prime low-elevation old-growth forest, about a dozen lakes of at least  and many large creeks and streams. There are seven trails that access the wilderness area with an additional seven trails within the protection boundaries themselves. Combined the system provides 
 of challenging terrain for both pedestrian and equestrian recreation.  
The name of the peak and thus the wilderness area comes from logging jargon in which the "bull of the woods" was the most experienced logging foreman in an operation.

Topography 
 tall Battle Ax summit is the highest point in the Wilderness. Among other tall peaks are  Schreiner Peak,  Big Slide Mountain and  Bull of the Woods Mountain, from which the area derives its name. An abandoned fire lookout stands at the top of Bull of the Woods Mountain, from which views of the Cascades and the surrounding territory can be seen.  The mountain slopes are quite steep, with lower inclines ranging from 30 to 60 degrees and upper inclines from 60 to 90 degrees.  The wilderness contains the headwaters of the Collawash, and Little North Santiam rivers.

Vegetation 
The forest consists almost solely of coniferous species such as Douglas Fir, Western Hemlock, and Western Red Cedar, but deciduous red alder is also prevalent along creeks.  Pacific yew is also common in certain parts of the wilderness, and rhododendrons can be seen blooming profusely throughout many areas around early June.  Bull of the Woods contains one of the last stands of old growth in western Oregon, and is home to the northern spotted owl.

Recreation 
Primary recreational activities in Bull of the Woods include camping, hiking, wildlife watching, and soaking in the hot springs.  It is possible to see relics of the 19th century gold rush, such as deserted mine shafts and old mining equipment.  Various trails lead to a fire lookout at the peak of Bull of the Woods Mountain, with fantastic views of the Wilderness.

Gallery

See also 
 List of Oregon Wildernesses
 List of U.S. Wilderness Areas
 List of old growth forests
 Wilderness Act

References

External links 
 
 

Cascade Range
Protected areas of Clackamas County, Oregon
Protected areas of Marion County, Oregon
Old-growth forests
Wilderness areas of Oregon
Mount Hood National Forest
1984 establishments in Oregon
Protected areas established in 1984